2007 Valencia GP2 Series round was the final round of the 2007 GP2 Series season. It was held on 29 September and 30, 2007 at the Circuit Ricardo Tormo in Valencia.

Classification

Qualifying

Feature race

Sprint race

References

Valencia
GP2